Survival Story is the second studio album by Flobots, released on March 16, 2010. It is the follow-up to 2007's highly successful Fight with Tools. Work on the album began in 2009, and it was produced by Mario Caldato, Jr. (of Beastie Boys fame). The album was met with mixed reviews from critics who commented on the band's political commentary being more preachy than their previous album.

Critical reception

Survival Story garnered a mixed reception from music critics who found it more meandering and preachy with its political leanings than its predecessor Fight with Tools. Mike Schiller of PopMatters criticized the album for falling into the preachy side of delivering political messages that similar acts like Rage Against the Machine and The Roots tend to avoid, concluding that "Survival Story is Just Another Rap-Rock Record, something you’ve probably heard if you ever listened to P.O.D., or Linkin Park, or Limp effing Bizkit. It’s trying to say something, but it’s failing, and all we end up hearing is noise." Nate Adams of No Ripcord also commented on the band's similarities to Rage Against the Machine, criticizing them for delivering unfocused and vague political commentary that's marketed to rap-rock fans in the teenage demographic. Eddie Fleisher of Alternative Press praised the group's two MCs for their vocal performances melding well with Mario Caldato, Jr.'s production, saying that "Those looking for another "Handlebars" may be disappointed–Survival Story is more mature effort, showing that Flobots' best material may be yet to come. " Jacob Royal of Sputnikmusic praised the musicianship throughout the album for experimenting with different sounds within its rap-rock parameters while still being able to deliver tracks with political commentary, saying that "Survival Story is an enjoyable album, and old-school fans of Flobots will definitely find reasons to be hooked to it for a long time."

Track listing

Singles
"White Flag Warrior" was the first single from the album, released digitally on 2 February 2010.

Personnel
Group members
Jamie Laurie – vocals, songwriter, guitar, drums, bass, keyboard
Andy Guererro – guitars, background vocals
Kenny Ortiz – drums
Brer Rabbit – vocals, songwriter
Mackenzie Roberts – viola, vocals, background vocals
Jesse Walker – bass

Additional
Omar Al-Joulani – booking
Nate Albert – artists and repertoire
Mario Caldato, Jr. – producer
Corrie Christopher – booking
Chris Gehringer – audio mastering
Michele Goldberg – artists and repertoire
Kristina Grossman – artists and repertoire
J.J. Italiano – management
Tom MacKay – artists and repertoire
Tim McIlrath – guest vocals
Matt Morris – guest vocals
Jonathan Till – artwork

Charts

References

2010 albums
Flobots albums
Universal Republic Records albums
Albums produced by Mario Caldato Jr.